USS Privateer (SP-179), later YP-179, was an armed motorboat that served in the United States Navy as a patrol vessel from 1917 to 1930.

Privateer was built for R. A. C. Smith as a civilian motorboat of the same name in 1917 by the Gas Engine and Power Company and Charles L. Seabury and Company at Morris Heights in the Bronx, New York. The U.S. Navy acquired her under charter from Smith for World War I service as a patrol vessel, and accordingly she was delivered to the Navy on 25 May 1917. She was commissioned as USS Privateer (SP-179) on 15 August 1917.

Privateer was assigned immediately to the 3rd Naval District, headquartered in the New York City area, where she served on section patrol  for most of World War I.

On 15 June 1918, Privateer escorted the new submarines USS N–4 (SS-56) and USS N–7 (SS-59) from Bridgeport, Connecticut, to the New York Navy Yard at Brooklyn, New York.

In early 1919, Privateer was attached to Naval Air Station Rockaway at Rockaway in Queens, New York, for postwar duty. On 28 July 1919 she was assigned to Squadron 19, 3rd District Naval Force, where she remained until January 1930, one of only a small number of World War I section patrol craft retained for lengthy postwar service.

In 1920, Privateer was reclassified as a district patrol craft and redesignated YP–179.

Privateer was decommissioned at Norfolk, Virginia, on 5 February 1930. She was stricken from the Naval Vessel Register on 7 March 1930 and transferred to the United States Shipping Board on 30 June 1930.

References

Department of the Navy: Naval Historical Center: Online Library of Selected Images: U.S. Navy Ships: USS Privateer (SP-179, later YP-179), 1917-1930
NavSource Online: Section Patrol Craft Photo Archive Privateer (YP 179) ex-SP-179

Patrol vessels of the United States Navy
World War I patrol vessels of the United States
Ships built in Morris Heights, Bronx
1917 ships